Julian Graves was a health food retailer, with 189 stores operating in the United Kingdom and Ireland, selling health foods, a limited range of kitchenware, baking ingredients and a variety of confectionery items. NBTY (which also owns Holland and Barrett) acquired the company in September 2008 from Baugur Group, with the merger approved in August 2009. On 2 July 2012, Julian Graves went into administration after failing to make a profit in the previous four years.

References

External links
 official website

Health food stores
Food retailers of the United Kingdom